This is the list of serving Air Marshals of the Pakistan Air Force. At present, the Air Force has 1 Air Chief Marshal (ACM), 11 Air Marshals (AM) and 47 Air Vice Marshals (AVM).

List of designated and active Four-Star Officer

List of designated and active Three-Star Officers

List of designated and active Two-Star Officers

See also
Federal Secretary
Grade 22
List of serving Generals of the Pakistan Army
List of serving Admirals of the Pakistan Navy

References

External links
 Pakistan Air Force (Official website) 

Pakistan Air Force air marshals
Air marshals
Pakistan
Air marshals
Pakistan Air Force